Frederick Hawkes (born 17 April 1881) was an English footballer who spent his entire career playing for his home-town club, Luton Town.

Career
Following a successful youth career in Luton, Hawkes received offers from other League clubs before signing for his local side Luton Town in 1899. Playing alongside Robert Hawkes (no relation) and Fred White in the Luton half-back line, Hawkes became one of the club's most consistent performers up until the outbreak of World War I. On his return from the conflict, he made 14 appearances during the 1919–20 season to complete a career that had lasted for over twenty years.

References

1881 births
Year of death missing
Footballers from Luton
English footballers
English Football League players
Southern Football League players
Luton Town F.C. players
Association football midfielders
British military personnel of World War I
Military personnel from Bedfordshire